Trevor Ray (died 24 December 2019) was a British actor, writer and script editor. As an actor he gained credits in many television series. As a writer and script editor he worked on series such as Doctor Who, Paul Temple and Children of the Stones. He died in December 2019.

Writing
Ray authored the final draft of Episode 1 of David Whitaker's much-rewritten Doctor Who serial The Ambassadors of Death (1970), but Whitaker received the sole credit on screen. He was an uncredited assistant script editor on the programme from The Invasion (1968) to Spearhead from Space (1970).

In October 1969, Ray joined former Doctor Who producers Peter Bryant and Derrick Sherwin to work on revamping another BBC series, Paul Temple.

Along with Jeremy Burnham, Ray co-wrote the children's fantasy television serial Children of the Stones (1977) for HTV. With Burnham, he also wrote the serial's novelization, published in the same year. With Burnham, he co-wrote a five episode children's serial entitled Raven (1977), as well as its novelization (1977). (A sequel to Children of the Stones, titled Return to the Stones - written by Jeremy Burnham, appeared first as an e-book in 2012 and then as a physical book in 2015.)

Acting
While working as script editor Terrance Dicks' assistant on Doctor Who in 1969, he also appeared on screen playing a ticket inspector in Doctor Who and the Silurians.

Ray appeared in Emmerdale Farm'' from 1972 to 1973 as Bart Ansett, a friend of Jack Sugden, and again in 1986 as Robin Parr.

Filmography

References

External links

2019 deaths
20th-century British novelists
Year of birth missing
Place of birth missing
British male novelists
British male television actors
British television producers
British television writers